The 2022 Connecticut State Senate election were held on November 8, 2022, as part of the biennial 2022 United States elections. Connecticut voters elected senators in all of the 36 State Senate districts. State senators serve two-year terms in the Connecticut State Senate, with all 36 of the seats up for election each cycle. Primary Elections were held in August 2022.

Predictions

Results 

One seat flipped from Republican to Democratic, resulting in a Democratic majority of 24–12 in the Senate chamber. This made up for the Democratic loss in the 2021 special election in District 36, resulting in the same senate composition following the 2020 senate election.

A special election in District 36 was held on August 17, 2021, to fill the vacancy left by Democrat Alex Kasser, who resigned effective June 22, 2021. Kasser cited her ongoing divorce proceedings as the reason for her resignation. Republican candidate Ryan Fazio was elected after defeating Democratic candidate Alexis Gevanter and Independent candidate John Blankley, flipping the seat from Democratic to Republican, resulting in a Democratic majority of 23-13 prior to the 2022 senate election.

7 incumbent senators, Steve Cassano (D-4th), Kevin Witkos (R-8th), Mary Daugherty Abrams (D-13th), Paul Formica (R-20th), Will Haskell (D-26th), Craig Miner (R-30th), Dan Champagne (R-35th), did not attempt to run for reelection. 1 incumbent, Dennis Bradley (D-23rd), was defeated in the primaries.

Composition

Detailed results

District 1 
Democratic incumbent John Fonfara was reelected to a 14th term after defeating Republican candidate Alexander Colaiacovo, Green Party candidate Oladotum Michael Oretade, and petitioning candidate Alyssa Peterson. Fonfara has represented the 1st District since 1997.

District 2 
Democratic incumbent Douglas McCrory was reelected to a 4th term after running unnopposed. McCrory has represented the 2nd District since 2017.

District 3 
Democratic incumbent Saud Anwar was reelected to a 3rd term after defeating Republican candidate Matt Harper. Anwar was also nominated by the Working Families Party. He has represented the 3rd District since 2019.

District 4 
Democratic candidate MD Rahman was elected after defeating Republican candidate Jacqueline Crespan. Rahman was also nominated by the Working Families Party. This seat was previously held by Democrat Steve Cassano since 2011.

District 5 
Democratic incumbent Derek Slap was reelectd to a 3rd term after running unnopposed. Slap has represented the 5th District since 2019.

District 6 
Democratic incumbent Rick Lopes was reelected to a 2nd term after defeating Republican candidate Tremell Collins. Lopes was also nominated by the Working Families Party. Lopes has represented the 6th District since 2021.

District 7 
Republican incumbent John Kissel was reelected to a 16th term after defeating Democratic candidate Cynthia Mangini. Kissel was also nominated by the Independent Party, while Mangini was also nominated by the Working Families Party. Kissel has represented the 7th District since 1993.

District 8 
Republican candidate Lisa Seminara was elected after defeating Democratic candidate Paul Honig. Seminara was also nominatd by the Independent Party. This seat was previously held by Kevin Witkos since 2009.

District 9 
Democratic incumbent Matt Lesser was reelected to a 3rd term after defeating Republican candidate Lisa Marotta. Lesser was nominated by both the Working Families Party and the Independent Party. He has represented the 9th District since 2019.

District 10 
Democratic incumbent Gary Winfield was reelectd to a 4th term after defeating Republican candidate John Carlson. Winfield was also nominated by the Working Families Party, while Carlson was nominated by the Independent Party. Winfield has represented the 10th District since 2017.

District 11 
Democratic incumbent and President pro tempore Martin Looney was reelected to a 16th term after defeating Republican candidate Steve Orosco. Looney has represented the 11th District since 1993.

District 12 
Democratic incumbent Christine Cohen was reelected to a 3rd term after defeating Republican candidate Paul Crisci. Cohen was also nominated by both the Independent Party and the Working Families Party. She has represented the 12th District since 2019.

District 13 
Democratic candidate Jan Hochadel was elected after defeating Republican candidate Joseph Vollano. Hochadel was also nominated by the Working Families Party, while Vollano was nominated by the Independent Party. This seat was previous held by Mary Abrams since 2019.

District 14 
Democratic incumbent James Maroney was reelected to a 3rd term after defeating Republican candidate Kim-Marie Mullin. Maroney was also nominated by the Independent Party. Maroney has represented the 14th District since 2019.

District 15 
Democratic incumbent Joan Hartley was reelected to a 12th term after running unnopposed. Hartley was also nominated by the Independent Party. She has represented the 15th District since 2001.

District 16 
Republican incumbent Rob Sampson was reelected to a 3rd term after defeating Democratic candidate Christopher Robertson. Sampson was also nominated by the Independent Party. Sampson has represented the 16th District since 2019.

District 17 
Democratic incumbent Jorge Cabrera was reelected to a 2nd term after defeating Republican candidate Kathy Hoyt. Cabrera was also nominated by both the Independent Party and the Working Families Party. He has represented the 17th District since 2021.

District 18 
Republican incumbent Heather Somers was reelected to a 4th term after defeating Democratic candidate Farouk Rajab. Somers was also nominated by the Independent Party, while Rajab was nominated by the Working Families Party. Somers has represented the 18th District since 2017.

District 19 
Democratic incumbent Cathy Osten was reelected to a 6th term after defeating Republican candidate Pietro Camardello. Osten was also nominated by both the Independent Party and the Working Families Party. She has represented the 19th District since 2013.

District 20 
Democratic candidate Martha Marx was elected after defeating Republican candidate Jerry Labriola Jr. Marx was also nominated by the Working Families Party, while Labriola was nominated by the Independent Party. This seat was previously held by Republican Paul Formica since 2015.

District 21 
Republican incumbent and Senate Minority Leader Kevin C. Kelly was reelected to a 7th term after defeating Democratic candidate Christopher Green.  6th term Republican Incumbent Kevin C. Kelly has represented the 21st District since 2011.

District 22 
Democratic incumbent Marilyn Moore was reelected to a 5th term after defeating Libertarian candidate Wilfredo Martinez. Moore has represented the 22nd District since 2015.

District 23 
Democratic candidate Herron Gaston was elected after defeating Republican candidate Michael Garrett and Working Families Party candidate Juliemar Ortiz. This seat was previously held by Democrat Dennis Bradley since 2019. He faced felony charges for alleged campaign finance violations committed during his first run in 2018, and was defeated in the primary.

District 24 
Democratic incumbent Julie Kushner was reeelected to a 3rd term after defeating Republican candidate Michelle Coelho. Kushner was also nominated by the Working Families Party, while Michelle Coelho was nominated by the Independent Party. Kushner has represented the 24th District since 2019.

District 25 
Democratic incumbent and Senate Majority leader Bob Duff was reelected to a 10th term after defeating Republican candidate Daniel Miressi and Independent candidate Lisa Brinton. Duff was also nominated by the Working Families Party. He has represented the 25th District since 2005.

District 26 
Democratic candidate Ceci Maher was elected after defeating Republican candidate Toni Boucher. Boucher was also nominated by the Independent Party. This seat was previous represented by  Will Haskell since 2019.

District 27 
Democratic incumbent Patricia Billie Miller was reelected to a 2nd term after defeating Republican candidate Michael Battinelli. Miller has represented the 27th District since 2021.

District 28 
Republican incumbent Tony Hwang was reelected to a 5th term after defeating Democratic candidate Timothy Gavin. Gavin was also nominated by the Independent Party. Hwang has represented the 28th District since 2015.

District 29 
Democratic incumbent Mae Flexer was reelected for a 5th term after defeating Republican candidate Susanne Witkowski and Green Party candidate Jean de Smet. Flexer was also nominated by both the Working Families Party and the Independent Party. She has represented the 29th district since 2015.

District 30 
Republican candidate Stephen Harding was elected after defeating Democratic candidate Eva Bermudez Zimmerman. Zimmerman was also nominated by both the Working Families Party and the Independent Party. This seat was previously held by Craig Miner since 2015.

District 31 
Republican incumbent Henri Martin was reelected to a 5th term after defeating Democratic candidate Greg Hahn. Martin was also nominated by the Independent Party. He has represented the 31st District since 2015.

District 32 
Republican incumbent Eric Berthel was reelected to a 4th term after defeating Democratic candidate Jeff Desmarais. Berthel has represented the 32nd District since 2017.

District 33 
Democrat incumbent Norm Needleman was reelected to a 3rd term after defeating Republican candidate Brandon Goff. Needleman was also nominated by the Independent Party. He has represented the 33rd District since 2019.

District 34 
Republican incumbent Paul Cicarella was reelected to a 2nd term after defeating Green Party candidate David Bedell. Cicarella was also nominated by the Independent Party. He has represented the 34th District since 2021.

District 35 
Republican candidate Jeff Gordon was elected after defeating Democratic candidate Lisa Thomas. Thomas was also nominated by the Independent Party and the Working Families Party. This seat was previous held by Dan Champagne since 2019.

District 36 
Republican incumbent Ryan Fazio was reelectd to a 2nd term after defeating Democratic candidate Trevor Crow. Fazio has represented the 36th District since 2021.

See also 
 2022 United States House of Representatives elections in Connecticut

Notes

References

External links 

State Senate
2022
Connecticut State Senate